is a female Japanese pop/folk rock singer.

Early life 
Cocco went to many ballet auditions, hoping to become a professional ballerina. She went to singing auditions to earn the traveling expenses for a ballet audition in Tokyo. She did not pass it, but after impressing the judges, she was later signed by Victor Entertainment.

Career 
Cocco made her debut on an indie label under the name "Cocko" with a self-titled EP Cocko on November 21, 1996. A track from the EP, Sing a Song ~No Music, No Life~, was used in an advertising campaign for Tower Records Japan.

On March 21, 1997, Cocco changed the official spelling of her name to "Cocco" and released her major label debut single Countdown. A full-length album followed shortly after. It was not until 1998 when she scored a big hit in Japan with Tsuyoku Hakanaimonotachi, which sold more than 250,000.

Cocco went on to record three more albums – Kumuiuta in 1998, Rapunzel in 2000, and Sangurōzu in 2001. Before the release of Sangurōzu, Cocco announced she was retiring from the music business. Later that year, her label released a career retrospective, Best + Ura Best + Mihappyōkyokushū, which contained her singles, some b-sides and five unreleased tracks.

Her retirement did not last long. In 2002, she published her first art book, Minami no Shima no Hoshi no Suna. In August 2003, she organized a benefit concert to raise awareness about cleaning up beaches in Okinawa. A DVD documentary entitled Heaven's Hell followed in December.

2004 saw her appearance on the Yutaka Ozaki cover album "BLUE" and the publication of her second book, Minami no Shima no Koi no Uta, which was accompanied by a limited edition single, "Garnet/Celeste Blue". In 2005, Cocco collaborated with photographer/singer Nanaco on a CD/book combination titled The Bird.

In late 2004, Cocco teamed up with Shigeru Kishida of the Japanese rock group Quruli to re-record "Sing a Song" for Tower Records' 25th Anniversary in Japan. The sessions inspired the formation of Singer Songer, a band featuring Cocco, Kishida, Quruli bassist Masashi Sato, Cornelius support keyboardist Hirohisa Horie and former FEED drummer Dai Taro.

Singer Songer made its live debut as special guests at Quruli's year-end concert in December 2004, and in May 2005, the band released a single, "Shoka Rinrin". An album, Barairo Pop was released in June 2005. It contains a selection of country-flavored tracks that are much happier than Cocco's previous works.

In April 2006, she wrote a series of essays for Mainichi Shimbun. Since then, Cocco has continued to write for various newspapers and magazines.

On July 7, 2007, Cocco performed at the Japanese leg of Live Earth at the Makuhari Messe, Chiba. After releasing the album Kira Kira, she started living in the UK and went to college to learn photography.

In 2010, Cocco published her first long novel "Polomerria". She appeared at the World Happiness 2010 rock festival in Tokyo on August 8. She released Emerald, her first self-produced album, on August 11. Cocco provided 14-year-old Director Ryugo Nakamura's first feature film Yagi no Boken with the theme song Yagi no Sanpo. She got a letter from the youngest film director in Japanese film history, and she decided to help the boy.

In 2011, the no-budget indie film Inspired movies produced by Cocco and her fellow video artists was released.

In 2012, Cocco made her acting debut, starring in KOTOKO, directed by Shinya Tsukamoto. She was also responsible for the art direction and music.

She covered "Good Bye" for the June 6, 2018 hide tribute album Tribute Impulse.

Discography

Studio albums

Compilation albums

Singles

Indie label

Major label

Others

Cocco-chan to Shigeru-kun 
 is a prototype of Singer Songer, and the member doesn't change.

Singer Songer 
Singer Songer is a musical group consists of five musicians, featuring Cocco as a lead singer.

Videography

Music video compilations

Concert tour videos

Documentaries

Filmography

Movies

Bibliography

References

External links
 Cocco official site 
 Discography 
 Nippop Profile | Cocco 
 Project J Profile
 

1977 births
Living people
People from Naha
Victor Entertainment artists
Musicians from Okinawa Prefecture
Folk-pop singers
20th-century Japanese women singers
20th-century Japanese singers
21st-century Japanese women singers
21st-century Japanese singers